Believe in Angels Believe in Me is the only solo studio album by American singer Angel. It was released on August 10, 2004, by Midas Records. The album was released a year after her departure from the girl group No Secrets. Believe in Angels Believe in Me failed to chart but did receive multiple reviews from well-known sources. Its singles reached the Billboard Hot Dance Tracks chart. A second album was recorded but never released. Angel went on to announce that she was leaving the entertainment industry to follow her dreams of higher education.

Critical reception

Track listing

Singles
"Just the Way I Am"
"How Can I Lie" Week Of Nov 27 2004 
"Lessons in Love" Week Of Mar 26 2005 
"Love Song with a Twist"
"Love Is"

Charts
Hot Dance Club Play
How Can I Lie Peak No. 48
Lessons In Love Peak No. 41

Release history

Production
Executive Producer: Mark Clapper
A&R: Andrew Nast

References

External links
Midas Records

Angel Faith albums
2004 debut albums
Albums produced by the Matrix (production team)